The tennis competitions at the 2017 Games of the Small States of Europe were held from 30 May to 3 June 2017 at the Montecchio Tennis Center, San Marino.

Medal table

Medal events

Men's singles

Women's singles

Men's doubles

Women's doubles

Mixed doubles

References

External links 
Results
Results book

2017
Games of the Small States of Europe
2017
2017 Games of the Small States of Europe